Laigh Kirk can mean "Low church" in general or the Church of Scotland in particular.  Many place names and personal names are also derived from it.

As a common noun, kirk is the Scots and Scottish English word for 'church', attested as a noun from the 14th century onwards, but as an element in placenames much earlier. Both words, kirk and church, derive from the Koine Greek κυριακόν (δωμα) (kyriakon (dōma)) meaning Lord's (house), which was borrowed into the Germanic languages in late antiquity, possibly in the course of the Gothic missions. (Only a connection with the idiosyncrasies of Gothic explains how a Greek neuter noun became a Germanic feminine.)  Whereas church displays Old English palatalisation, kirk is likely to be a loanword from Old Norse and thus has the original mainland Germanic consonants. Compare cognates: Icelandic & Faroese kirkja; Swedish kyrka; Norwegian & Danish kirke; German Kirche; Dutch kerk; West Frisian tsjerke; and borrowed into non-Germanic languages: Estonian kirik and Finnish kirkko.

Church of Scotland
Christian terminology